Vivekanand Education Society's Institute of Technology, also known as VESIT or V. E. S. Institute of Technology, was established in 1984 as an engineering college affiliated with the University of Mumbai.

Campus

The campus is located in Harshu Advani Memorial Complex, Chembur-east, Mumbai-400074, a northeastern suburb of Mumbai, and stretches over a few acres of land. VESIT moved to the present campus from its old one (also in Chembur) in December 2010.

The engineering college (VESIT) shares its campus with the college of Pharmacy and the college for Management and Research. The campus comprises one C-shaped building for the engineering college and several other buildings for the other colleges, hostels, etc. VESIT has a multi storey building, wherein each floor is allotted to each of the five departments, and the ground floor comprises the administrative office, principal's office, examination department, canteen, etc. VESIT also has a  library on the first floor and an open section on the second floor.

References

External links
ves.ac.in, Official Website

Engineering colleges in Mumbai
Affiliates of the University of Mumbai
Educational institutions established in 1984
1984 establishments in Maharashtra